Xanthos (Lycian: 𐊀𐊕𐊑𐊏𐊀 Arñna, Latin: Xanthus, Turkish: Ksantos) was an ancient major city near present-day Kınık, Antalya Province, Turkey. The remains of Xanthos lie on a hill on the left bank of the Xanthos river. The number and quality of the monumental tombs still standing is a remarkable feature of the site.

Xanthos is a UNESCO World Heritage Site. 

Xanthos was a centre of culture and commerce for the Lycians, and later for the Persians, Greeks and Romans who in turn conquered the city. As an important city in Lycia, it exerted significant architectural influences upon other cities of the region, with the Nereid Monument directly inspiring the Mausoleum at Halicarnassus in Caria.

Xanthos is the Greek appellation, acquired during its Hellenisation, of Arñna in the Lycian language. The Hittite and Luwian name of the city is given in inscriptions as Arinna (not to be confused with the Arinna near Hattusa). The Romans called the city Xanthus.

History 

Trojan War heroes and Lycian leaders Glaucus and Sarpedon, founder of Xanthos, are described in the Iliad as allies of the Trojans. In the same text, Achilles' immortal, talking horse is named Xanthos. 

The acropolis of Xanthos dates from the 8th c. BC. The city is mentioned by numerous ancient Greek and Roman writers and Strabo notes Xanthos as the largest city in Lycia.

The important religious sanctuary of Leto at Letoon, 4 km south of Xanthos, dates from the late 6th century BC and was closely associated with the city and linked by a sacred road.

Under the Persian Empire 

Both Herodotus and Appian describe the conquest of the city by Harpagus on behalf of the Persian Empire, in approximately 540 BC. According to Herodotus, the Persians met and defeated a small Lycian army in the flatlands to the north of the city. After the encounter, the Lycians retreated into the city which was besieged by Harpagus. The Lycians destroyed their acropolis, killed their wives, children and slaves, then proceeded on a suicidal attack against the superior Persian troops. Thus, the entire population of Xanthos perished but for 80 families who were absent during the fighting.

During the Persian occupation, a local leadership was installed and by 520 BC it was already minting its own coins. By 516 BC, Xanthos was included in the first nomos of Darius I in the tribute list. 

Xanthos's fortunes were tied to Lycia's as Lycia changed sides during the Greco-Persian Wars. Archaeology demonstrates that Xanthos's wooden tombs and temples were destroyed in approximately 470 BC probably by the Athenian Kimon  to retaliate for the destruction of the Athenian Acropolis by the Persians and their Lycian allies. As there is no reference to this destruction in either Persian or Greek sources, some scholars attribute the destruction to natural or accidental causes. Xanthos was rebuilt in stone.

In the final decades of the 5th century BC, Xanthos was strong enough to conquer nearby Telmessos and incorporate it into Lycia. The prosperity of Lycia during the Persian occupation is demonstrated by the extensive architectural achievements in Xanthos, particularly the many tombs culminating in the Nereid Monument, the tomb of King Arbinas who asserted control over Lycia in 400 BC, and built in 390 BC.

Conquest by Alexander the Great 

Reports on the city's surrender to Alexander the Great differ: Arrian reports a peaceful surrender, but Appian claims that the city was sacked. After Alexander's death, the city changed hands among his rival heirs; Diodorus notes the capture of Xanthos by Ptolemy I Soter from Antigonos.

Roman and Byzantine rule 

In 42 BC Brutus came to Lycia in the Roman Civil Wars, to obtain funds for his campaign in that year before the Battle of Philippi. The Lycian League refused to contribute; Brutus besieged Xanthos and the city was once again destroyed and only 150 Xanthian men survived the carnage. It was rebuilt under Mark Antony. 

Xanthus was in the Roman province of Lycia, in the civil Diocese of Asia.

Marinos reports that there was a school of grammarians at Xanthos in late antiquity.

Ecclesiastical history

Bishopric 

Xanthus was important enough in the Roman province of Lycia to become a suffragan of the Metropolitan Archbishopric of provincial capital Myra, in the sway of the Patriarchate of Constantinople.

Three of its bishops are historically documented :
 Macedon, participant in the First Council of Constantinople in 381
 Athanasius, signed in 458 the letter of the episcopate of Lycia to Byzantine emperor Leo I the Thracian after Coptic mobs lynched Patriarch Proterius of Alexandria
 Giorgius, participant in the Council in Trullo in 692.

Titular see 
In the Eastern Orthodox Church, Xanthoupolis is a titular diocese under the Ecumenical Patriarchate of Constantinople, whose bishop assisted the Metropolitan Province of Smyrna, part of the larger Province of Asia Minor. Its last known bishop was Father Ignatios, later Metropolitan of Libya under the Patriarchate of Alexandria, who presided over this diocese from 1863 to 1884.

In the Catholic Church, the diocese was nominally restored in 1933 as Latin Titular bishopric of Xanthus (Latin) / Xanto (Curiate Italian) / Xanthien(sis) (Latin adjective).

It is vacant, having had a single incumbent, not of the fitting Episcopal (lowest) rank but archiepiscopal :
 Titular Archbishop: Bruno Bernard Heim (Swiss) (1961.11.09 – death 2003.03.18), as papal diplomat and heraldist (also author) : Apostolic Delegate to Scandinavia (1961.11.09 – 1969.05.07), Apostolic Pro-Nuncio to Finland (1966 – 1969.05.07), Apostolic Pro-Nuncio to Egypt (1969.05.07 – 1973.07.16), Apostolic Delegate to Great Britain (1973.07.16 – 1982), Apostolic Pro-Nuncio to Great Britain (1982 – retired 1985) and on emeritate When asked where Xanthus was, Heim would jokingly reply: "Most of it is now in the British Museum".

Archaeology 

Xanthos has been a mecca for students of Anatolian civilisation since the early 19th century. 

Of the monumental tombs, three, the Nereid Monument the Tomb of Payava and the sculptures of the Harpy tomb, are now exhibited in the British Museum on account of their splendid sculptural decoration and architecture. The Harpy Tomb, of equal merit but less well preserved, is still located in Xanthos with replica reliefs. 

The archeological excavations and surface investigations at Xanthos have yielded many texts in Lycian and Greek, including bilingual texts that are useful in the understanding of Lycian. The Xanthian Obelisk and the Letoon trilingual are two trilingual stelae which were found in the city and Letoon and record an older Anatolian language conventionally called Milyan language.

The River Xanthos 

Strabo reports the original name of the river as Sibros or Sirbis. During the Persian invasion the river is called Sirbe, which means "yellow", like the Greek word "xanthos". The river usually has a yellow hue because of the soil in the alluvial base of the valley. Today the site of Xanthos overlooks the modern Turkish village of Kınık. Once over 500 m long, the Roman Kemer Bridge crossed the upper reaches of the river near the present-day village of Kemer. The modern Turkish name of the river is Eşen Çayı.

A Greek legend is that the river was created by the birth pangs of Leto, whose temple, at Letoon, is on the west bank of the river a few km south of Xanthos.

References

Sources and external links 
 GCatholic - (former &) titular see

  Includes downloadable published works
 UNESCO: Xanthos-Letoon
 Extensive picture series of Xanthos
 Bibliography 
 Pius Bonifacius Gams, Series episcoporum Ecclesiae Catholicae, Leipzig 1931, p. 450
 Michel Lequien, Oriens christianus in quatuor Patriarchatus digestus, Paris 1740, vol.I, coll. 981-984
 Trevor R. Bryce, The Lycians, vol. I, pp. 12–27
 Strabo, 14.3.6
 Herodotus, 1.176
 Appian, Bell. Civ., 4.10.76–80, 5.1.7
 Arrian, Anab. 1.24.4
 Diodorus 20.27.1
 Dio Cassius, 47, 34.1–3
 Plutarch, Brutus 30–31
 Marinos, Vita Procli 6–8
 Quintus Smyrn. 11.22–26

Greek colonies in Anatolia
World Heritage Sites in Turkey
Populated places in ancient Lycia
Turkish Riviera
Former populated places in Turkey
Archaeological sites in Antalya Province
Geography of Antalya Province
Ancient Greek archaeological sites in Turkey
Defunct dioceses of the Ecumenical Patriarchate of Constantinople
Catholic titular sees in Asia
Kaş District